Maja Čukić (born 26 May 1995) is a Montenegrin fashion model and beauty pageant titleholder who won the title of Miss Universe Montenegro 2014 and represented her country at the Miss Universe 2015 pageant.

Personal life
Currently, Čukić is working at a fashion agency in New York City. She began her career in the fashion industry as a model and represented Bar at the Miss Montenegro pageant (Crna Gora) in 2014.

Miss Montenegro 2014
In 2014, Čukić was placed as the 1st Runner-up at the Miss Montenegro pageant where the winner, Natasa Novaković, competed as Miss Montenegro World 2014.

In 2013, Montenegro was withdrawn from the Miss Universe pageant after withdrawing Nikoleta Jovanović, Miss Montenegro 2013. There was no Montenegrin delegate in the Miss Universe 2014 pageant either. In 2014, Čukić was announced to be participating in the Miss Universe 2015 pageant, representing Montenegro and marking the country's return.

Miss Universe 2015
Čukić represented Montenegro at the Miss Universe 2015 pageant on 20 December 2015. She was one of the candidates who pushed and disrespected the winner, Pia Wurtzbach of the Philippines. She deleted her social media accounts due to the scare that she will be receiving hates from her bashers. Even the Ms. Montenegro Universe Organization condemns the attitude she displayed towards Ms. Universe 2015.
Up to this day, Maja Čukić doesn't have an active project, brands and producers declined booking her as a model or a talent due to her bad attitude.

References

External links
Official Miss Serbia and Miss Montenegro website

Montenegrin beauty pageant winners
1996 births
People from Bar, Montenegro
Living people
Miss Universe 2015 contestants